Ted Smith (August 9, 1928 – May 8, 1992) was an American cyclist. He competed in the team pursuit event at the 1948 Summer Olympics.

References

1928 births
1992 deaths
American male cyclists
Olympic cyclists of the United States
Cyclists at the 1948 Summer Olympics
People from Cheektowaga, New York
Sportspeople from Erie County, New York
American track cyclists